Enzo Trulli (born 15 April 2005) is an Italian racing driver who is scheduled to compete in the 2023 Super Formula Lights with TOM'S He is the 2021 Formula 4 UAE champion, and most recently raced for Carlin in the FIA Formula 3 Championship.

He is the son of Formula One race winner Jarno Trulli.

Career

Karting 
Trulli starting karting competitively in 2017. He achieved a result of 25th in the 2018 CIK-FIA Karting World Championship in the KF2 category. He improved his result to 18th two years later in the same category.

Formula 4 
At the end of 2020, Trulli tested single-seaters for the first time, partake in post-season test in the Italian F4 Championship.

Trulli made his single-seater debut at the start of 2021, partnering Enzo Scionti in the Formula 4 UAE Championship at Cram Durango. He would become embroiled in a close title battle with Dilano van 't Hoff throughout the campaign, winning four races and finishing on the podium a further nine times. A podium in the final race at the Dubai Autodrome meant that Trulli would win the title, a sole point ahead of his Dutch adversary. Trulli was also announced to race in  the 2021 F4 Spanish Championship with Drivex School, but he ended up not taking part in the championship.

Euroformula Open 

For his main campaign in 2021, the Italian moved to the Euroformula Open Championship with Drivex School, once again driving alongside Enzo Scionti. He started his season strongly, taking third place in just his third race. Trulli would miss the round at the Hungaroring, but returned the next round with Carlin. The Italian would end the season with three third places in the final four races and end seventh in the standings, the highest placed driver not to win a race.

FIA Formula 3 
Having "[worked] really hard to do Euroformula" before the 2022 season, Trulli progressed into the FIA Formula 3 Championship at the last minute, partnering Zak O'Sullivan and Brad Benavides at Carlin. Trulli was set for his best finish of the season in Spa-Francorchamps sprint race with 16th place, but was disqualified due to a red flag infringement. The Italian finished the championship 34th, and had a best finish of 17th twice. He was also outpaced by teammates Zak O'Sullivan and Brad Benavides, who managed to score points. Trulli did not return to Formula 3 the following season.

Super Formula 
After being left without a Formula 3 drive, Trulli switched to racing in Asia, partaking in the Super Formula Lights during the 2023 season with TOM'S.

Karting record

Karting career summary

Racing record

Racing career summary

Complete F4 UAE Championship results 
(key) (Races in bold indicate pole position) (Races in italics indicate fastest lap)

Complete Euroformula Open Championship results 
(key) (Races in bold indicate pole position; races in italics indicate points for the fastest lap of top ten finishers)

Complete FIA Formula 3 Championship results 
(key) (Races in bold indicate pole position; races in italics indicate points for the fastest lap of top ten finishers)

References

External links 
 

Living people
2005 births
Italian racing drivers
Euroformula Open Championship drivers
Carlin racing drivers
FIA Formula 3 Championship drivers
Sportspeople from Pescara
Cram Competition drivers
Drivex drivers
Karting World Championship drivers
FA Racing drivers
UAE F4 Championship drivers
TOM'S drivers